173rd or 173d may refer to:

173d Air Refueling Squadron, unit of the Nebraska Air National Guard 155th Air Refueling Wing
173D Special Troops Battalion, combat engineer battalion of the United States Army headquartered in Italy
173rd (3/1st London) Brigade, formation of the British Army's Territorial Force that was raised in 1915
173rd Airborne Brigade Combat Team, airborne infantry brigade combat team of the United States Army based in Italy
173rd Aviation Squadron (Australia), Australian Army helicopter squadron providing support to the Special Operations Command
173rd Battalion (Canadian Highlanders), CEF, unit in the Canadian Expeditionary Force during the First World War
173rd Division (People's Republic of China), created in February 1949
173rd Fighter Wing, unit of the Oregon Air National Guard, stationed at Kingsley Field Air National Guard Base
173rd meridian east, from the North Pole across the Pacific Ocean, New Zealand, the Southern Ocean, and Antarctica to the South Pole
173rd meridian west, from the North Pole across the Arctic Ocean, Asia, the Pacific Ocean, the Southern Ocean, and Antarctica to the South Pole
173rd New York State Legislature met from January 4, 1961, to March 31, 1962
173rd New York Volunteer Infantry, infantry regiment in the Union Army during the American Civil War
173rd Ohio Infantry, infantry regiment in the Union Army during the American Civil War
173rd pope, Pope Gregory VIII (1100–1187), reigned from 21 October to his death
173rd Rifle Division, infantry division of the Soviet Union's Red Army during World War II
173rd Support Battalion (United States), Combat Support Battalion of the United States Army based in Italy
173rd Tunnelling Company, in the Royal Engineers, created by the British Army during World War I
Pennsylvania's 173rd Representative District, located in Philadelphia County

See also
173 (number)
173, the year 173 (CLXXIII) of the Julian calendar
173 BC